Lagetta is a genus of plants in the family Thymelaeaceae.

Species
Species include:
 Lagetta lagetto.

References

Thymelaeoideae
Malvales genera